The men's 200 metre backstroke event at the 2014 Asian Games took place on 21 September 2014 at Munhak Park Tae-hwan Aquatics Center.

Schedule
All times are Korea Standard Time (UTC+09:00)

Records

Results

Heats

Final

References
Heats Results
Final Results

External links
Official website

Swimming at the 2014 Asian Games